Roger Federer defeated Rafael Nadal in the final, 2–6, 6–2, 6–0 to win the singles tennis title at the 2007 Hamburg Masters. With the win, Federer ended Nadal's record streak of 81 consecutive wins on clay, the longest single-surface win streak in the Open Era. It was Nadal's first loss on clay in over two years.

Tommy Robredo was the defending champion, but lost in the second round to Nicolás Almagro.

Seeds
A champion seed is indicated in bold text while text in italics indicates the round in which that seed was eliminated. The top 8 seeds received a bye into the second round.

  Roger Federer (champion)
  Rafael Nadal (final)
  Nikolay Davydenko (third round)
  Novak Djokovic (quarterfinals)
  Fernando González (quarterfinals)
  Tommy Robredo (second round)
  Ivan Ljubičić (third round)
  James Blake (third round)
  Andy Murray (first round, retired due to a wrist injury)
  Tomáš Berdych (second round)
  Richard Gasquet (second round)
  David Ferrer (quarterfinals)
  Mikhail Youzhny (first round)
  Marcos Baghdatis (first round)
  Juan Carlos Ferrero (third round)
  Lleyton Hewitt (semifinals)

Draw

Finals

Section 1

Section 2

Section 3

Section 4

Qualifying

Qualifying seeds

Qualifiers

Special exempt
  Filippo Volandri (reached the semifinals at Rome)

Qualifying draw

First qualifier

Second qualifier

Third qualifier

Fourth qualifier

Fifth qualifier

Sixth qualifier

Seventh qualifier

References

External links
2007 Hamburg Masters draw
2007 Hamburg Masters Qualifying draw
ITF tournament profile

Singles